Victoria station was a railway station in Victoria, British Columbia, on the east end of the Johnson Street Bridge.  The station opened in 1888, and was the southern terminus for Via Rail's Dayliner service which operated until 2011. The station closed on August 12, 2011.

History 
In 1886, the E&N Railway began operating from Esquimalt to Nanaimo. The station opened in 1888, following an extension from Esquimalt station to the station site.

In 1905, the E&N Railway was sold to the Canadian Pacific Railway. In 1979, Via Rail took over operation of the passenger services of CPR. The former station building was built in the 1980s.

Closure

Suspension of service 
On March 19, 2011, Via Rail suspended service indefinitely due to poor track conditions and replaced it with a bus service. Eventually, on August 12, 2011, bus service ended and the station closed.

Bridge replacement 
As part of the Johnson Street Bridge replacement project, the rail bridge across the Inner Harbour was removed and the station dismantled. The station roof was eventually salvaged by the Greater Victoria Harbour Authority in 2012.

Timeline 

 1905: E&N Railway sold to the CPR.
 March 19, 2011: Victoria–Courtenay service suspended.
 March 31, 2011: The rail portion of the bridge was closed.
 August 12, 2011: Temporary bus replacement discontinued, station officially closed.
 2012: Station is dismantled for construction nearby and the Johnson Street Bridge project.

References

External links 
Via Rail Station Description
Via Rail The authority that operated passenger services to the station.

Via Rail stations in British Columbia
Buildings and structures in Victoria, British Columbia
Transport in Victoria, British Columbia
Railway stations closed in 2011
Disused railway stations in Canada